Bukowina  is a village in the administrative district of Gmina Cewice, within Lębork County, Pomeranian Voivodeship, in northern Poland. Prior to 1945 it was part of Germany, and was considered part of the Province of Pomerania.

For details of the history of the region, see History of Pomerania.

The village has a population of 541.

References

Bukowina